PVI may refer to:

People 

 Pope Paul VI, head of the Roman Catholic Church 1963-1978
 Peter van Inwagen, American philosopher

Companies 

 PVI Virtual Media Services, virtual advertising and imaging company
 Power Vehicle Innovation, the French electric and natural gas bus and truck manufacturer
 PetroVietnam Insurance, a subsidiary of PetroVietnam

Medicine 

Pleth variability index
 Pulmonary vein isolation or pulmonary vein ablation, a surgical procedure to treat atrial fibrillation

Other 

 Cook Partisan Voting Index
 Paul VI Catholic High School in Fairfax, Virginia, named for Pope Paul VI
 Paul VI High School in Haddonfield, New Jersey, named for Pope Paul VI
 Polyvinyl imidazole, a polymer of vinylimidazole
 Polyvinyl isobutyl ether, a type of polyvinyl ether